George Arnold Robson (22 April 1897–1984) was an English footballer who played in the Football League for Ashington and South Shields.

References

1897 births
1984 deaths
English footballers
Association football defenders
English Football League players
Blyth Spartans A.F.C. players
North Shields F.C. players
Raith Rovers F.C. players
St Mirren F.C. players
Gateshead A.F.C. players
Southampton F.C. players
Ashington A.F.C. players